Caitilyn Allen (born 1957 in Göttingen, Germany) is an American plant pathologist, specializing in phytobacteriology (i.e., bacterial diseases of plants). She is an internationally recognized expert on bacterial wilt and has received several awards for her work.

Education and career
Caitilyn Allen grew up in the USA's Midwest. She studied from 1975 to 1978 at Swarthmore College and then worked on a farm growing organic vegetables, but the venture was unprofitable. She studied for the academic year 1980–1981 at the University of Maine at Orono, where she graduated with a B.S. in botany. In 1987 she graduated with a Ph.D. in plant pathology from the Virginia Polytechnic Institute and State University. Her Ph.D. thesis is entitled Evolution of a gene for pathogenicity; endo-pectate lyase.

As a postdoc, Allen was from 1986 to 1988 a research associate in Lyon at the CNRS Laboratoire de génétique moléculaire microbienne. (She is fluent in French.) From 1988 to 1992 she held a postdoc position at the University of Wisconsin-Madison (UWM), where she began research on bacterial wilt. Subsequently, she pursued such studies for next three decades. In 1992 she became a faculty member in UWM's department of plant pathology. She began as an assistant professor, was promoted to associate professor, became a full professor, and is now the department's Ethel and O. N. Allen Professor. (She is unrelated to Ethel and O. N. Allen.)

Allen became in 1995 the founding director of UWM's Women In Science and Engineering Residential Learning Community (called the WISE Dorm) and for her directorship received in 2001 the Women Engineers Professional/Academic Network National Women In
Engineering Program Award. She has received several teaching awards. In 2008 she received from the French government the Palmes Académiques for her contribution to French education and culture. In 2009 she was elected a Fellow of the American Association for the Advancement of Science. In 2020 the American Society for Microbiology gave her the Alice C. Evans Award.

Selected publications

Articles

Books
 ;

References

External links
 
 

1957 births
Living people
American phytopathologists
University of Maine alumni
Virginia Tech alumni
University of Wisconsin–Madison faculty
Fellows of the American Association for the Advancement of Science